Nathaniel Clarke Wallace (May 21, 1844 – October 8, 1901) was a Canadian politician and Orangeman.

Born in Woodbridge, Ontario, the third son of the Nathanael Wallace and Ann Wallace, natives of County Sligo, Ireland, who came to Canada in 1834 and 1833 respectively. He was educated in Woodbridge Public School and at the Weston Grammar School. A merchant and flour miller, he was reeve of Vaughan from 1874 to 1879 and warden of the County of York in 1878.

Wallace was elected as the Liberal-Conservative candidate to the House of Commons of Canada for York West in 1878, 1882, 1887, 1891, 1896, and 1900. He was controller of customs of Canada from 1892 until 1895.

He was grand master of the Loyal Orange Association of British America and was president of the Triennial Council of the Orangemen of the World.

He died in office in 1901.

External links 

 Clarke Wallace family fonds, Archives of Ontario

References
 
 

1844 births
1901 deaths
Conservative Party of Canada (1867–1942) MPs
Members of the House of Commons of Canada from Ontario